Frisk Asker Ishockey, commonly known as Frisk Asker, is a Norwegian ice hockey club based in Asker, Norway. The team is currently a member of the highest Norwegian ice hockey league, Fjordkraft-Ligaen. They are based in the municipality of Asker, around 20 km from Oslo, and play their home games in Varner Arena. The team colours are orange, black and white.

Frisk Asker is the ice hockey division of the Norwegian sports club IF Frisk Asker, founded in 1922. The ice hockey division was started in 1935. Having merged with IK Tigrene in 1969, Frisk became one of the strongest teams in Norwegian ice hockey, winning two national championships and four regular season titles during the 1970s. In the 2000s, the club won another two titles, one regular season title and one national championship, while competing as the Frisk Tigers.

History

Frisk is one of the oldest ice hockey clubs in Norway, dating back to 1935. For most of the early years the club did alright, playing mostly in the lower regional leagues. In 1968 the club was set for a great new era. Farmer Bjørn Mortensen wished to give something back to the community by building an indoor ice rink in Asker. It was the first of its kind in the Oslo area, and gave the club a tremendous lift.

Askerhallen was opened on 31 August 1969, and led to a series of events that would bring Frisk to the pinnacle of Norwegian Ice Hockey in only a few years. In Asker the facilities was first class, but playing material scarce. In Oslo, a club called Tigrene, had the exact opposite problems, so the two clubs decided to merge. Frisk immediately rose to become one of the top teams in the league.

In May 1972 disaster struck, as the Askerhallen was badly damaged in a fire. Mortensen however wished to continue his commitment, and have the arena rebuilt. The new Askerhallen was opened in 1973.

The seventies proved to be the most successful years for Frisk. Winning the Norwegian championships in 1975 and 1979.

Through the eighties Frisk stayed in the top flight, and excelled at producing talented hockey-players. Led by inspirational coach Barry Smith they made a new appearance in the play off finals in 1986. On the most however they failed to make any real impact and economical problems led the club into recession and finally relegation in the mid nineties. A merger with local club Holmen, under the name of Asker Hockey proved unsuccessful and in 1995 Frisk was back in the top league on their own feet.

The turn of the millennium saw Frisk Asker stabilized as a strong team in the top flight. In 2002, Frisk could finally celebrate their third Norwegian championship, after beating the Storhamar Dragons in a dramatic final.

Frisk won their fourth Norwegian championship in 2019.

Season-by-season results
This is a partial list of the last five seasons completed by the Frisk Asker. For the full season-by-season history, see List of Frisk Asker seasons.

Retired numbers

Records and statistics 

Statistics for regular season and playoffs.
  – current active player

Scoring leaders

Most league matches 

Last updated: 28 May 2018Source: www.friskasker.no

Leaders

Head coaches 
 Barry Smith 1984–1986
 Henry Hamberg 1996–1998
 Serge Boisvert 1998–2003
 Ulf Weinstock 2003–2004
 Michael A. L. Tipson 20/20
 Jan Votruba 2004–2005
 Esa Tikkanen 2005–2006
 Patrik Christer Ross 2006–2007
 Sune Bergman 2007–2010
 Mats Lusth 2010–2012
 Sune Bergman 2012–2018
 Scott Hillman 2018–

Notes

External links 
 Official website 

 
1922 establishments in Norway
GET-ligaen teams
Ice hockey teams in Norway
Organisations based in Asker
Sport in Asker
Ice hockey clubs established in 1935
1935 establishments in Norway